Star Turtle may also refer to Great A'Tuin.

Star Turtle is an album by Harry Connick Jr., released in 1996, receiving a Gold Album Certification July 8, 2004. It is primarily a funk album, but also features pop, Mardi Gras rhythms, ballads and rock.
 
"City Beneath the Sea" describes unique New Orleans street scenes, and features a brief but notable piano solo.

"Hear Me in the Harmony" became an MTV hit. The song is a tribute to James Booker.

Four of the tracks, namely the four "Star Turtle" tracks, tell a tale of a giant space turtle coming to New Orleans, looking for music salvation. He is given a tour through the city and samples the musical diversity, visiting a funk club, a jazz club, and a street parade.
These four tracks ("Star Turtle 1", 2, 3 & 4) are special; the first one is a wild arrangement of drums, horns, guitars and overdubbed, whispery voices. Connick plays every instrument and is the voice of every word heard on the four pieces.

Track listing
All music and lyrics composed by Harry Connick Jr.
"Star Turtle" – 4:35
"How Do Y'all Know" – 4:55
"Hear Me in the Harmony" – 4:46
"Reason to Believe" – 4:50
"Just Like Me" – 4:46
"Star Turtle 2" – 2:27
"Little Farley" – 6:05
"Eyes of the Seeker" – 4:51
"Nobody Like You to Me" – 3:43
"Boozehound" – 5:14
"Star Turtle 3" – 2:10
"Never Young" – 5:26
"Mind on the Matter" – 4:09 – sung by Tony Hall (the bassist)
"City Beneath the Sea" – 5:59
"Star Turtle 4" – 1:45

The CD includes a CD-ROM multimedia presentation.

Target Bonus tracks
"Voodoo Mama" – 7:12

Musicians
Harry Connick Jr. – vocals, Piano
Jonathan DuBose Jr. – Guitar, vocals
Howard Kaplan – Keyboards
Lucien Barbarin – Trombone
Tony Hall – Bass, vocals
Louis Ford – Clarinet
Raymond Weber – drums, percussion
Ned Goold – Tenor Saxophone
Jerry Weldon – Tenor Saxophone 
Dave Schumacher – Baritone Saxophone
Jeremy Davenport – Trumpet
Dan Miller – Trumpet
John Allred – Trombone, Tuba
Mark Mullins – Trombone
Tracey Freeman – Producer
Gregg Rubin – Recording & Mix Engineer

Charts

Weekly charts

Year-end charts

Certifications and sales

References

External links

1996 albums
Blues rock albums by American artists
Jazz fusion albums by American artists
Harry Connick Jr. albums